Morrisonia mucens, the gray woodgrain, is a moth of the family Noctuidae. The species was first described by Jacob Hübner in 1831. It is found in the United States from coastal Massachusetts south to Florida and west to Texas.

The wingspan is about 29 mm. There is one generation per year.

Larvae have been reared on Quercus nigra.

References

Hadeninae